The Paramonov Warehouses was a nineteenth century complex of storage facilities in Rostov-on-Don. The ruins of the buildings are located on the banks of the Don River between Sokolova Avenue and Universitetskaya Alley. The remains are listed as a monument of federal importance.

History 
The oldest surviving building of the Paramonov Warehouses was built in the middle of the 19th century, and the most recent dates the end of the 1890s. The warehouses were built by engineers Yakunin and E. Shulman. During their operational lifetime the warehouses belonged to various owners and companies, but are now commonly associated with the grain-industrialist .

The warehouses escaped destruction during the bombardments of the port of Rostov-on-Don during the Great Patriotic War. One aerial bomb hit the complex, breaking the water-cooling system. Much of the damage to the warehouses came after their abandonment. Over their working existence the warehouses survived at least five fires. During the last days of the USSR the warehouses were used to store cement and building materials.

In 1985 the Paramonov Warehouses were assigned the status of a historical and cultural monument of local importance. Later the historical monument acquired status of a monument of federal importance.

Architectural features 
The warehouses incorporated laconic brick décor with motives of Romanesque and Classical architecture.

Engineers Yakunin and E. Shulman used springs from the Don River's coastal slope, which flowed all year. The water was collected in chutes and channelled through the storage facilities. The temperature of the spring water flowing through the warehouses was a constant +9 °C during the winter and the summer. This maintained reduced temperature in the warehouses, which was conducive for storing grains.

Round apertures remain in the interfloor spaces on the front of the warehouses. They were used to move grain through tarpaulin sleeves from the second floors of the warehouses to the embankment level. From there grains would be transhipped to barges for export.

Current state 

All of the warehouses are currently in ruins, and exposed to spring water from the Don River’s coastal slopes. Because of the constant temperature, the ruins have their own microclimate: grass grows there almost all year.

In June 2011, a local enthusiasts’ initiative carried out a litter cleaning activity dubbed “Augean stables” on the Paramonov Warehouses. The Legislative Assembly of Rostov Oblast did not support the activity, considering this work illegal, but pop singer Natalya Vetlitskaya supported it.

The dumping of litter and domestic waste on the grounds of the warehouses has continued. In June 2012, the Kirovsky District court of Rostov-on-Don satisfied the regional Assistant Attourney's plaint to the district ministry of culture and several other organisations, in which Assistant Attourney requested the development of a project to create protection zones for the monument of cultural legacy "The Paramonov Warehouses" and to place informational signs on the grounds. The Ministry of Culture of Rostov Oblast tried to appeal this decision, but in August 2012 the full court of civil affairs of the Rostov Oblast court left the appeal without satisfaction.

In December 2013, the Ministry of Property of Rostov Oblast approved the project of development and reconstruction of the Paramonov Warehouses. The project of reconstruction was developed by one of the Moscow architect bureaus. According to this project, during the reconstruction of the Paramonov Warehouses all buildings will be retained and a centre of contemporary art will be opened in the grounds.

On 23 December 2015 news was leaked that the Paramonov Warehouses might be completely demolished and then rebuilt. In doing so, the new complex would lose its natural basin. This was announced by the head of city administration Sergey Gorban during the regional organizing committee's meeting on the preparations for the 2018 FIFA World Cup: "Conducted expertise showed that all building are in alarming condition and are liable for dismantling and reconstruction. Herewith the basin preservation is not planned".

On the evening of 28 January 2016, a message spread in social medias which said that the famous basin of the Paramonov Warehouses no longer existed. The proof of it was a video showing that the basin had been dismantled slowly and safely. The administration of Rostov-on-Don commented on the situation, setting out the background of the work. An official statement from the administration's department of information policy read "In the beginning of December 2015 the conference was held in Kirovskaya administration in the presence of regional head, his assistants, representative of law-enforcement agencies and persons in charge of PVT "Alliance-M"  – the company leasing the warehouses. It was said in conferences that local residents were constantly complaining of binges, brawls and robberies of naval school's students made by warehouses’ "guests", Besides, it was pointed out to the alarming condition of object and the quality of water – according to the conclusion of SES, the water was not suitable for drinking or bathing.  As a result, the participants of the conference came to general consensus: to let out water from the unauthorized basin and to rail off building of the Paramonov warehouses for citizens’ safety. A deadline was also set – before 15 December, however PVT "Alliance-M" met half-way with the public and gave the opportunity to celebrate the holiday of Baptism with guarding of Kirovskaya OVD. As of today, water is let out from building, barriers were set all around. The entrance to the Paramonov Warehouses will be closed."

Reconstruction of storage facilities was conducted by PVT "Alliance-M". An agreement for a  lease for a period of 45 years between the company and the owner of the Paramonov Warehouses was concluded in the end of 2013. The total of planned investments is 1 billion 240 million rubles.

Company director Vladimir Bondarenko said that in place of ramshackle warehouses there could be several hotels, a concert and exhibition hall, a spa complex with apartments and a restaurant complex. According to the concept offered to investors, two warehouses would be reconstructed into hotels with apartments on upper floors with views from the windows facing the Don River. The building where springs flowed into a basin where citizens bathed was planned to be made into spa complex, with hothouses and restaurants in front. The building of the most distant warehouse, which was better preserved than others, was suggested to be made into a multifunctional concert hall. It was planned to arrange a two-storied parking and technical zone under the whole complex of the Paramonov Warehouses.

The auction for sale of the Paramonov Warehouses was set for 31 July 2017, with a starting price of 8.8 million rubles, comparable to the cost of a one-room flat in Moscow.

In cinema 
 2010 – , documentary. VGIK studio.
 2016 – on 16 January 2016 the warehouses hosted a preview of the film Mr. Junkman (directed by Nikolai Lebedev, produced by ).

Sources 

Tourist attractions in Rostov-on-Don
Buildings and structures in Rostov-on-Don
Cultural heritage monuments in Rostov-on-Don
Cultural heritage monuments of federal significance in Rostov Oblast
Ruins in Russia